Robin Heights is a cluster of high rock summits between Hei Glacier and Kvitsvodene Valley in the Sverdrup Mountains, Queen Maud Land. It was photographed from the air by the German Antarctic Expedition (1938–39). It was mapped by Norwegian cartographers from surveys and air photos by the Norwegian-British-Swedish Antarctic Expedition (NBSAE) (1949–52) and air photos by the Norwegian expedition (1958–59), and was named for Gordon de Q. Robin, third in command and a physicist with the NBSAE.

Mountains of Queen Maud Land
Princess Martha Coast